Maximilian I may refer to:
Maximilian I, Holy Roman Emperor, reigned 1486/93–1519
Maximilian I, Elector of Bavaria, reigned 1597–1651
Maximilian I, Prince of Hohenzollern-Sigmaringen (1636-1689)
Maximilian I Joseph of Bavaria, reigned 1795–1805 (Elector of Bavaria) and 1806–1825 (King of Bavaria)
Maximilian I of Mexico, reigned 1864–1867